Philip or Phil Norton may refer to:

Philip Norton, Baron Norton of Louth (born 1951), author and politician
Phil Norton, baseball pitcher
Phil Norton, character in American Ninja